Tut Shami (also Romanized as Tūt Shāmī; also known as Naūt Shāmī and Tūt Shāhī) is a village in Gurani Rural District, Gahvareh District, Dalahu County, Kermanshah Province, Iran. At the 2006 census, its population was 318, in 79 families.

Tut Shami is important to the Yarsani religion as it is the residence of the Haydarî family, one of the leading spiritual leaders or sayyeds of the Goran Kurds.

References 

Populated places in Dalahu County
Yarsan holy places
Kurdish settlements in Kermanshah Province